Tony Danielle Driver (born August 4, 1977) is a former American football defensive back that played for the Buffalo Bills of the National Football League (NFL). He was selected in the sixth round of the 2001 NFL Draft. He played for the Bills in 2001 and 2002. Driver played college football at the University of Notre Dame.

References

External links
Pro-Football-Reference
University of Notre Dame Fighting Irish football bio

1977 births
Living people
Players of American football from Louisville, Kentucky
American football defensive backs
Buffalo Bills players
Notre Dame Fighting Irish football players
Louisville Male High School alumni
Ed Block Courage Award recipients